Degenan (Dingana) is one of the Finisterre languages of Papua New Guinea.

The nearly extinct Tanda, reported in 2010, is distinct.

References

Finisterre languages
Languages of Madang Province